"Shine" is a song written by Filipino songwriter Trina Belamide for the 1996 Metro Manila Popular Music Festival (Metropop), where it won second place. It was originally performed by Ima Castro, and was performed by Sweet Plantado in the Metropop live performances .

Cover versions 
In 2005 the song again became a hit in the Philippines as sung by Regine Velasquez. 

In celebration of the song's 25th anniversary in 2021, Morissette was chosen to record a new version with arrangements by Filipino-American music producer Troy Laureta.

References

1996 singles
Regine Velasquez
2005 singles
2021 singles
English-language Filipino songs